Gong was the highest title of Chinese nobility during the Zhou Dynasty and the second highest title, ranked below Wang, from the Han Dynasty onwards. Gong is usually translated as "duke".

Examples 
 Duke Yansheng, the title of the direct descendants of Confucius through the main line of descent

Chinese honorifics